Thomas Werner Reck (born 16 January 1964 in Ulm) is a German former field hockey player who competed in the 1984 Summer Olympics and in the 1988 Summer Olympics.

References

External links
 

1964 births
Living people
German male field hockey players
Olympic field hockey players of West Germany
Field hockey players at the 1984 Summer Olympics
Field hockey players at the 1988 Summer Olympics
Olympic silver medalists for West Germany
Olympic medalists in field hockey
Sportspeople from Ulm
Medalists at the 1988 Summer Olympics
Medalists at the 1984 Summer Olympics
20th-century German people